Foundations of mathematics is the study of the philosophical and logical and/or algorithmic basis of mathematics, or, in a broader sense, the mathematical investigation of what underlies the philosophical theories concerning the nature of mathematics. In this latter sense, the distinction between foundations of mathematics and philosophy of mathematics turns out to be vague.
Foundations of mathematics can be conceived as the study of the basic mathematical concepts (set, function, geometrical figure, number, etc.) and how they form hierarchies of more complex structures and concepts, especially the fundamentally important structures that form the language of mathematics (formulas, theories and their models giving a meaning to formulas, definitions, proofs, algorithms, etc.) also called metamathematical concepts, with an eye to the philosophical aspects and the unity of mathematics. The search for foundations of mathematics is a central question of the philosophy of mathematics; the abstract nature of mathematical objects presents special philosophical challenges.

The foundations of mathematics as a whole does not aim to contain the foundations of every mathematical topic.
Generally, the foundations of a field of study refers to a more-or-less systematic analysis of its most basic or fundamental concepts, its conceptual unity and its natural ordering or hierarchy of concepts, which may help to connect it with the rest of human knowledge. The development, emergence, and clarification of the foundations can come late in the history of a field, and might not be viewed by everyone as its most interesting part.

Mathematics plays a special role in scientific thought, serving since ancient times as a model of truth and rigor for rational inquiry, and giving tools or even a foundation for other sciences (especially Physics). Mathematics' many developments towards higher abstractions in the 19th century brought new challenges and paradoxes, urging for a deeper and more systematic examination of the nature and criteria of mathematical truth, as well as a unification of the diverse branches of mathematics into a coherent whole.

The systematic search for the foundations of mathematics started at the end of the 19th century and formed a new mathematical discipline called mathematical logic, which later had strong links to theoretical computer science.
It went through a series of crises with paradoxical results, until the discoveries stabilized during the 20th century as a large and coherent body of mathematical knowledge with several aspects or components (set theory, model theory, proof theory, etc.), whose detailed properties and possible variants are still an active research field.
Its high level of technical sophistication inspired many philosophers to conjecture that it can serve as a model or pattern for the foundations of other sciences.

Historical context

Ancient Greek mathematics 

While the practice of mathematics had previously developed in other civilizations, special interest in its theoretical and foundational aspects was clearly evident in the work of the Ancient Greeks.

Early Greek philosophers disputed as to which is more basic, arithmetic or geometry.
Zeno of Elea (490 c. 430 BC) produced four paradoxes that seem to show the impossibility of change. The Pythagorean school of mathematics originally insisted that only natural and rational numbers exist. The discrepancy between rationals and reals was finally resolved by Eudoxus of Cnidus (408–355 BC), a student of Plato, who reduced the comparison of two irrational ratios to comparisons of multiples of the magnitudes involved. His method anticipated that of the Dedekind cut in the modern definition of real numbers by Richard Dedekind (1831–1916).

In the Posterior Analytics, Aristotle (384–322 BC) laid down the axiomatic method for organizing a field of knowledge logically by means of primitive concepts, axioms, postulates, definitions, and theorems. Aristotle took a majority of his examples for this from arithmetic and from geometry.
This method reached its high point with Euclid's Elements (300 BC), a treatise on mathematics structured with very high standards of rigor: Euclid justifies each proposition by a demonstration in the form of chains of syllogisms (though they do not always conform strictly to Aristotelian templates).
Aristotle's syllogistic logic, together with the axiomatic method exemplified by Euclid's Elements, are recognized as scientific achievements of ancient Greece.

Platonism as a philosophy of mathematics 

Starting from the end of the 19th century, a Platonist view of mathematics became common among practicing mathematicians. 

The concepts or, as Platonists would have it, the objects of mathematics are abstract and remote from everyday perceptual experience: geometrical figures are conceived as idealities to be distinguished from effective drawings and shapes of objects, and numbers are not confused with the counting of concrete objects. Their existence and nature present special philosophical challenges: How do mathematical objects differ from their concrete representation? Are they located in their representation, or in our minds, or somewhere else? How can we know them?

The ancient Greek philosophers took such questions very seriously. Indeed, many of their general philosophical discussions were carried on with extensive reference to geometry and arithmetic. Plato (424/423 BC 348/347 BC) insisted that mathematical objects, like other platonic Ideas (forms or essences), must be perfectly abstract and have a separate, non-material kind of existence, in a world of mathematical objects independent of humans. He believed that the truths about these objects also exist independently of the human mind, but is discovered by humans. In the Meno Plato's teacher Socrates asserts that it is possible to come to know this truth by a process akin to memory retrieval.

Above the gateway to Plato's academy appeared a famous inscription: "Let no one who is ignorant of geometry enter here". In this way Plato indicated his high opinion of geometry. He regarded geometry as "the first essential in the training of philosophers", because of its abstract character.

This philosophy of Platonist mathematical realism is shared by many mathematicians. Some authors argue that Platonism somehow comes as a necessary assumption underlying any mathematical work.

In this view, the laws of nature and the laws of mathematics have a similar status, and the effectiveness ceases to be unreasonable. Not our axioms, but the very real world of mathematical objects forms the foundation.

Aristotle dissected and rejected this view in his Metaphysics. These questions provide much fuel for philosophical analysis and debate.

Aristotelian realism

Middle Ages and Renaissance 
For over 2,000 years, Euclid's Elements stood as a perfectly solid foundation for mathematics, as its methodology of rational exploration guided mathematicians, philosophers, and scientists well into the 19th century.

The Middle Ages saw a dispute over the ontological status of the universals (platonic Ideas): Realism asserted their existence independently of perception; conceptualism asserted their existence within the mind only; nominalism denied either, only seeing universals as names of collections of individual objects (following older speculations that they are words, "logoi").

René Descartes published La Géométrie (1637), aimed at reducing geometry to algebra by means of coordinate systems, giving algebra a more foundational role (while the Greeks used lengths to define the numbers that are presently called real numbers). Descartes' book became famous after 1649 and paved the way to infinitesimal calculus.

Isaac Newton (1642–1727) in England and Leibniz (1646–1716) in Germany independently developed the infinitesimal calculus on a basis that required new foundations. In particular, Leibniz described infinitesimals as numbers that are infinitely close to zero, a concept that does not fit in previous foundational framework of mathematics, and was not formalized before the 20th century. The strong implications of infinitesimal calculus on foundations of mathematics is illustrated by a pamphlet of the  Protestant philosopher George Berkeley (1685–1753), who wrote "[Infinitesimals] are neither finite quantities, nor quantities infinitely small, nor yet nothing. May we not call them the ghosts of departed quantities?". Leibniz also worked on logic but most of his writings on it remained unpublished until 1903.

Then mathematics developed very rapidly and successfully in physical applications.

19th century 
In the 19th century, mathematics became increasingly abstract. Concerns about logical gaps and inconsistencies in different fields led to the development of axiomatic systems.

Real analysis 

Cauchy (1789–1857) started the project of formulating and proving the theorems of infinitesimal calculus in a rigorous manner, rejecting the heuristic principle of the generality of algebra exploited by earlier authors. In his 1821 work Cours d'Analyse he defines infinitely small quantities in terms of decreasing sequences that converge to 0, which he then used to define continuity. But he did not formalize his notion of convergence.

The modern (ε, δ)-definition of limit and continuous functions was first developed by Bolzano in 1817, but remained relatively unknown. It gives a rigorous foundation of infinitesimal calculus based on the set of real numbers, arguably resolving the Zeno paradoxes and Berkeley's arguments.

Mathematicians such as Karl Weierstrass (1815–1897) discovered pathological functions such as continuous, nowhere-differentiable functions. Previous conceptions of a function as a rule for computation, or a smooth graph, were no longer adequate. Weierstrass began to advocate the arithmetization of analysis, to axiomatize analysis using properties of the natural numbers.

In 1858, Dedekind proposed a definition of the real numbers as cuts of rational numbers. This reduction of real numbers and continuous functions in terms of rational numbers, and thus of natural numbers, was later integrated by Cantor in his set theory, and axiomatized in terms of second order arithmetic by Hilbert and Bernays.

Group theory 

For the first time, the limits of mathematics were explored. Niels Henrik Abel (1802–1829), a Norwegian, and Évariste Galois, (1811–1832) a Frenchman, investigated the solutions of various polynomial equations, and proved that there is no general algebraic solution to equations of degree greater than four (Abel–Ruffini theorem). With these concepts, Pierre Wantzel (1837) proved that straightedge and compass alone cannot trisect an arbitrary angle nor double a cube. In 1882, Lindemann building on the work of Hermite showed that a straightedge and compass quadrature of the circle (construction of a square equal in area to a given circle) was also impossible by proving that  is a transcendental number. Mathematicians had attempted to solve all of these problems in vain since the time of the ancient Greeks.

Abel and Galois's works opened the way for the developments of group theory (which would later be used to study symmetry in physics and other fields), and abstract algebra. Concepts of vector spaces emerged from the conception of barycentric coordinates by Möbius in 1827, to the modern definition of vector spaces and linear maps by Peano in 1888. Geometry was no more limited to three dimensions.
These concepts did not generalize numbers but combined notions of functions and sets which were not yet formalized, breaking away from familiar mathematical objects.

Non-Euclidean geometries 

After many failed attempts to derive the parallel postulate from other axioms, the study of the still hypothetical hyperbolic geometry by Johann Heinrich Lambert (1728–1777) led him to introduce the hyperbolic functions and compute the area of a hyperbolic triangle (where the sum of angles is less than 180°). Then the Russian mathematician Nikolai Lobachevsky (1792–1856) established in 1826 (and published in 1829) the coherence of this geometry (thus the independence of the parallel postulate), in parallel with the Hungarian mathematician János Bolyai (1802–1860) in 1832, and with Gauss.
Later in the 19th century, the German mathematician Bernhard Riemann developed Elliptic geometry, another non-Euclidean geometry where no parallel can be found and the sum of angles in a triangle is more than 180°. It was proved consistent by defining point to mean a pair of antipodal points on a fixed sphere and line to mean a great circle on the sphere. At that time, the main method for proving the consistency of a set of axioms was to provide a model for it.

Projective geometry 
One of the traps in a deductive system is circular reasoning, a problem that seemed to befall projective geometry until it was resolved by Karl von Staudt. As explained by Russian historians:

The purely geometric approach of von Staudt was based on the complete quadrilateral to express the relation of projective harmonic conjugates. Then he created a means of expressing the familiar numeric properties with his Algebra of Throws. English language versions of this process of deducing the properties of a field can be found in either the book by Oswald Veblen and John Young, Projective Geometry (1938), or more recently in John Stillwell's Four Pillars of Geometry (2005). Stillwell writes on page 120

The algebra of throws is commonly seen as a feature of cross-ratios since students ordinarily rely upon numbers without worry about their basis. However, cross-ratio calculations use metric features of geometry, features not admitted by purists. For instance, in 1961 Coxeter wrote Introduction to Geometry without mention of cross-ratio.

Boolean algebra and logic 
Attempts of formal treatment of mathematics had started with Leibniz and Lambert (1728–1777), and continued with works by algebraists such as George Peacock (1791–1858).
Systematic mathematical treatments of logic came with the British mathematician George Boole (1847) who devised an algebra that soon evolved into what is now called Boolean algebra, in which the only numbers were 0 and 1 and logical combinations (conjunction, disjunction, implication and negation) are operations similar to the addition and multiplication of integers. Additionally, De Morgan published his laws in 1847. Logic thus became a branch of mathematics. Boolean algebra is the starting point of mathematical logic and has important applications in computer science.

Charles Sanders Peirce built upon the work of Boole to develop a logical system for relations and quantifiers, which he published in several papers from 1870 to 1885.

The German mathematician Gottlob Frege (1848–1925) presented an independent development of logic with quantifiers in his Begriffsschrift (formula language) published in 1879, a work generally considered as marking a turning point in the history of logic. He exposed deficiencies in Aristotle's Logic, and pointed out the three expected properties of a mathematical theory

 Consistency: impossibility of proving contradictory statements.
 Completeness: any statement is either provable or refutable (i.e. its negation is provable).
 Decidability: there is a decision procedure to test any statement in the theory.

He then showed in Grundgesetze der Arithmetik (Basic Laws of Arithmetic) how arithmetic could be formalised in his new logic.

Frege's work was popularized by Bertrand Russell near the turn of the century. But Frege's two-dimensional notation had no success. Popular notations were (x) for universal and (∃x) for existential quantifiers, coming from Giuseppe Peano and William Ernest Johnson until the ∀ symbol was introduced by Gerhard Gentzen in 1935 and became canonical in the 1960s.

From 1890 to 1905, Ernst Schröder published Vorlesungen über die Algebra der Logik in three volumes. This work summarized and extended the work of Boole, De Morgan, and Peirce, and was a comprehensive reference to symbolic logic as it was understood at the end of the 19th century.

Peano arithmetic 

The formalization of arithmetic (the theory of natural numbers) as an axiomatic theory started with Peirce in 1881 and continued with Richard Dedekind and Giuseppe Peano in 1888. This was still a second-order axiomatization (expressing induction in terms of arbitrary subsets, thus with an implicit use of set theory) as concerns for expressing theories in first-order logic were not yet understood. In Dedekind's work, this approach appears as completely characterizing natural numbers and providing recursive definitions of addition and multiplication from the successor function and mathematical induction.

Foundational crisis 
The foundational crisis of mathematics (in German Grundlagenkrise der Mathematik) was the early 20th century's term for the search for proper foundations for mathematics.

Several schools of the philosophy of mathematics ran into difficulties one after the other in the 20th century, as the assumption that mathematics had any foundation that could be consistently stated within mathematics itself was heavily challenged by the discovery of various paradoxes (such as Russell's paradox).

The name "paradox" should not be confused with contradiction. A contradiction in a formal theory is a formal proof of an absurdity inside the theory (such as ), showing that this theory is inconsistent and must be rejected. But a paradox may be either a surprising but true result in a given formal theory, or an informal argument leading to a contradiction, so that a candidate theory, if it is to be formalized, must disallow at least one of its steps; in this case the problem is to find a satisfying theory without contradiction. Both meanings may apply if the formalized version of the argument forms the proof of a surprising truth. For instance, Russell's paradox may be expressed as "there is no set of all sets" (except in some marginal axiomatic set theories).

Various schools of thought opposed each other. The leading school was that of the formalists, of which David Hilbert was the foremost proponent, culminating in what is known as Hilbert's program, intending to ground mathematics on a small basis of a logical system proved sound by metamathematical finitistic means. The main opponent of the formalist school was the intuitionist school, led by L. E. J. Brouwer, which resolutely discarded formalism as a meaningless game with symbols. The fight was acrimonious. In 1920 Hilbert succeeded in having Brouwer, whom he considered a threat to mathematics, removed from the editorial board of Mathematische Annalen, the leading mathematical journal of the time.

Philosophical views 

At the beginning of the 20th century, three schools of philosophy of mathematics opposed each other: Formalism, Intuitionism and Logicism. The Second Conference on the Epistemology of the Exact Sciences  held in Königsberg in 1930 gave space to these three schools.

Formalism 

It has been claimed that formalists, such as David Hilbert (1862–1943), hold that mathematics is only a language and a series of games. Indeed, he used the words "formula game" in his 1927 response to L. E. J. Brouwer's criticisms:

Thus Hilbert is insisting that mathematics is not an arbitrary game with arbitrary rules; rather it must agree with how our thinking, and then our speaking and writing, proceeds.

The foundational philosophy of formalism, as exemplified by David Hilbert, is a response to the paradoxes of set theory, and is based on formal logic. Virtually all mathematical theorems today can be formulated as theorems of set theory. The truth of a mathematical statement, in this view, is represented by the fact that the statement can be derived from the axioms of set theory using the rules of formal logic.

Merely the use of formalism alone does not explain several issues: why we should use the axioms we do and not some others, why we should employ the logical rules we do and not some others, why do "true" mathematical statements (e.g., the laws of arithmetic) appear to be true, and so on. Hermann Weyl would ask these very questions of Hilbert:

In some cases these questions may be sufficiently answered through the study of formal theories, in disciplines such as reverse mathematics and computational complexity theory. As noted by Weyl, formal logical systems also run the risk of inconsistency; in Peano arithmetic, this arguably has already been settled with several proofs of consistency, but there is debate over whether or not they are sufficiently finitary to be meaningful. Gödel's second incompleteness theorem establishes that logical systems of arithmetic can never contain a valid proof of their own consistency. What Hilbert wanted to do was prove a logical system S was consistent, based on principles P that only made up a small part of S. But Gödel proved that the principles P could not even prove P to be consistent, let alone S.

Intuitionism 

Intuitionists, such as L. E. J. Brouwer (1882–1966), hold that mathematics is a creation of the human mind. Numbers, like fairy tale characters, are merely mental entities, which would not exist if there were never any human minds to think about them.

The foundational philosophy of intuitionism or constructivism, as exemplified in the extreme by Brouwer and Stephen Kleene, requires proofs to be "constructive" in nature the existence of an object must be demonstrated rather than inferred from a demonstration of the impossibility of its non-existence. For example, as a consequence of this the form of proof known as reductio ad absurdum is suspect.

Some modern theories in the philosophy of mathematics deny the existence of foundations in the original sense.  Some theories tend to focus on mathematical practice, and aim to describe and analyze the actual working of mathematicians as a social group. Others try to create a cognitive science of mathematics, focusing on human cognition as the origin of the reliability of mathematics when applied to the real world. These theories would propose to find foundations only in human thought, not in any objective outside construct. The matter remains controversial.

Logicism 

Logicism is a school of thought, and research programme, in the philosophy of mathematics, based on the thesis that mathematics is an extension of a logic or that some or all mathematics may be derived in a suitable formal system whose axioms and rules of inference are 'logical' in nature. Bertrand Russell and Alfred North Whitehead championed this theory initiated by Gottlob Frege and influenced by Richard Dedekind.

Set-theoretic Platonism 

Many researchers in axiomatic set theory have subscribed to what is known as set-theoretic Platonism, exemplified by Kurt Gödel.

Several set theorists followed this approach and actively searched for axioms that may be considered as true for heuristic reasons and that would decide the continuum hypothesis. Many large cardinal axioms were studied, but the hypothesis always remained independent from them and it is now considered unlikely that CH can be resolved by a new large cardinal axiom. Other types of axioms were considered, but none of them has reached consensus on the continuum hypothesis yet. Recent work by Hamkins proposes a more flexible alternative: a set-theoretic multiverse allowing free passage between set-theoretic universes that satisfy the continuum hypothesis and other universes that do not.

Indispensability argument for realism 

This argument by Willard Quine and Hilary Putnam says (in Putnam's shorter words),

However, Putnam was not a Platonist.

Rough-and-ready realism 
Few mathematicians are typically concerned on a daily, working basis over logicism, formalism or any other philosophical position. Instead, their primary concern is that the mathematical enterprise as a whole always remains productive. Typically, they see this as ensured by remaining open-minded, practical and busy; as potentially threatened by becoming overly-ideological, fanatically reductionistic or lazy.

Such a view has also been expressed by some well-known physicists.

For example, the Physics Nobel Prize laureate Richard Feynman said

And Steven Weinberg:

Weinberg believed that any undecidability in mathematics, such as the continuum hypothesis, could be potentially resolved despite the incompleteness theorem, by finding suitable further axioms to add to set theory.

Philosophical consequences of Gödel's completeness theorem 

Gödel's completeness theorem establishes an equivalence in first-order logic between the formal provability of a formula and its truth in all possible models. Precisely, for any consistent first-order theory it gives an "explicit construction" of a model described by the theory; this model will be countable if the language of the theory is countable. However this "explicit construction" is not algorithmic. It is based on an iterative process of completion of the theory, where each step of the iteration consists in adding a formula to the axioms if it keeps the theory consistent; but this consistency question is only semi-decidable (an algorithm is available to find any contradiction but if there is none this consistency fact can remain unprovable).

This can be seen as giving a sort of justification to the Platonist view that the objects of our mathematical theories are real. More precisely, it shows that the mere assumption of the existence of the set of natural numbers as a totality (an actual infinity) suffices to imply the existence of a model (a world of objects) of any consistent theory. However several difficulties remain:

 For any consistent theory this usually does not give just one world of objects, but an infinity of possible worlds that the theory might equally describe, with a possible diversity of truths between them.
 In the case of set theory, none of the models obtained by this construction resemble the intended model, as they are countable while set theory intends to describe uncountable infinities. Similar remarks can be made in many other cases. For example, with theories that include arithmetic, such constructions generally give models that include non-standard numbers, unless the construction method was specifically designed to avoid them.
 As it gives models to all consistent theories without distinction, it gives no reason to accept or reject any axiom as long as the theory remains consistent, but regards all consistent axiomatic theories as referring to equally existing worlds. It gives no indication on which axiomatic system should be preferred as a foundation of mathematics.
 As claims of consistency are usually unprovable, they remain a matter of belief or non-rigorous kinds of justifications. Hence the existence of models as given by the completeness theorem needs in fact two philosophical assumptions: the actual infinity of natural numbers and the consistency of the theory.

Another consequence of the completeness theorem is that it justifies the conception of infinitesimals as actual infinitely small nonzero quantities, based on the existence of non-standard models as equally legitimate to standard ones. This idea was formalized by Abraham Robinson into the theory of nonstandard analysis.

More paradoxes 

The following lists some notable results in metamathematics.  Zermelo–Fraenkel set theory is the most widely studied axiomatization of set theory. It is abbreviated ZFC when it includes the axiom of choice and ZF when the axiom of choice is excluded.

1920: Thoralf Skolem corrected Leopold Löwenheim's proof of what is now called the downward Löwenheim–Skolem theorem, leading to Skolem's paradox discussed in 1922, namely the existence of countable models of ZF, making infinite cardinalities a relative property.
1922: Proof by Abraham Fraenkel that the axiom of choice cannot be proved from the axioms of Zermelo set theory with urelements.
1931: Publication of Gödel's incompleteness theorems, showing that essential aspects of Hilbert's program could not be attained. It showed how to construct, for any sufficiently powerful and consistent recursively axiomatizable system such as necessary to axiomatize the elementary theory of arithmetic on the (infinite) set of natural numbers a statement that formally expresses its own unprovability, which he then proved equivalent to the claim of consistency of the theory; so that (assuming the consistency as true), the system is not powerful enough for proving its own consistency, let alone that a simpler system could do the job. It thus became clear that the notion of mathematical truth can not be completely determined and reduced to a purely formal system as envisaged in Hilbert's program. This dealt a final blow to the heart of Hilbert's program, the hope that consistency could be established by finitistic means (it was never made clear exactly what axioms were the "finitistic" ones, but whatever axiomatic system was being referred to, it was a 'weaker' system than the system whose consistency it was supposed to prove).
1936: Alfred Tarski proved his truth undefinability theorem.
1936: Alan Turing proved that a general algorithm to solve the halting problem for all possible program-input pairs cannot exist.
1938: Gödel proved the consistency of the axiom of choice and of the generalized continuum hypothesis.
1936–1937: Alonzo Church and Alan Turing, respectively, published independent papers showing that a general solution to the Entscheidungsproblem is impossible: the universal validity of statements in first-order logic is not decidable (it is only semi-decidable as given by the completeness theorem).
1955: Pyotr Novikov showed that there exists a finitely presented group G such that the word problem for G is undecidable.
1963: Paul Cohen showed that the Continuum Hypothesis is unprovable from ZFC. Cohen's proof developed the method of forcing, which is now an important tool for establishing independence results in set theory.
1964: Inspired by the fundamental randomness in physics, Gregory Chaitin starts publishing results on algorithmic information theory (measuring incompleteness and randomness in mathematics).
1966: Paul Cohen showed that the axiom of choice is unprovable in ZF even without urelements.
1970: Hilbert's tenth problem is proven unsolvable: there is no recursive solution to decide whether a Diophantine equation (multivariable polynomial equation) has a solution in integers.
1971: Suslin's problem is proven to be independent from ZFC.

Toward resolution of the crisis 
Starting in 1935, the Bourbaki group of French mathematicians started publishing a series of books to formalize many areas of mathematics on the new foundation of set theory.

The intuitionistic school did not attract many adherents, and it was not until Bishop's work in 1967 that constructive mathematics was placed on a sounder footing.

One may consider that Hilbert's program has been partially completed, so that the crisis is essentially resolved, satisfying ourselves with lower requirements than Hilbert's original ambitions. His ambitions were expressed in a time when nothing was clear: it was not clear whether mathematics could have a rigorous foundation at all.

There are many possible variants of set theory, which differ in consistency strength, where stronger versions (postulating higher types of infinities) contain formal proofs of the consistency of weaker versions, but none contains a formal proof of its own consistency. Thus the only thing we don't have is a formal proof of consistency of whatever version of set theory we may prefer, such as ZF.

In practice, most mathematicians either do not work from axiomatic systems, or if they do, do not doubt the consistency of ZFC, generally their preferred axiomatic system. In most of mathematics as it is practiced, the incompleteness and paradoxes of the underlying formal theories never played a role anyway, and in those branches in which they do or whose formalization attempts would run the risk of forming inconsistent theories (such as logic and category theory), they may be treated carefully.

The development of category theory in the middle of the 20th century showed the usefulness of set theories guaranteeing the existence of larger classes than does ZFC, such as Von Neumann–Bernays–Gödel set theory or Tarski–Grothendieck set theory, albeit that in very many cases the use of large cardinal axioms or Grothendieck universes is formally eliminable.

One goal of the reverse mathematics program is to identify whether there are areas of "core mathematics" in which foundational issues may again provoke a crisis.

See also 

 Aristotelian realist philosophy of mathematics
 Mathematical logic
 Brouwer–Hilbert controversy
 Church–Turing thesis
 Controversy over Cantor's theory
 Epistemology
 Euclid's Elements
 Hilbert's problems
 Implementation of mathematics in set theory
 Liar paradox
 New Foundations
 Philosophy of mathematics
 Principia Mathematica
 Quasi-empiricism in mathematics
 Mathematical thought of Charles Peirce

Notes

References 
 Avigad, Jeremy (2003) Number theory and elementary arithmetic, Philosophia Mathematica Vol. 11, pp. 257–284
 Eves, Howard (1990), Foundations and Fundamental Concepts of Mathematics Third Edition, Dover Publications, INC, Mineola NY,  (pbk.) cf §9.5 Philosophies of Mathematics pp. 266–271. Eves lists the three with short descriptions prefaced by a brief introduction.
 Goodman, N.D. (1979), "Mathematics as an Objective Science", in Tymoczko (ed., 1986).
 Hart, W.D. (ed., 1996), The Philosophy of Mathematics, Oxford University Press, Oxford, UK.
 Hersh, R. (1979), "Some Proposals for Reviving the Philosophy of Mathematics", in (Tymoczko 1986).
 Hilbert, D. (1922), "Neubegründung der Mathematik.  Erste Mitteilung", Hamburger Mathematische Seminarabhandlungen 1, 157–177.  Translated, "The New Grounding of Mathematics.  First Report", in (Mancosu 1998).
 Katz, Robert (1964), Axiomatic Analysis, D. C. Heath and Company.
 
 In Chapter III A Critique of Mathematic Reasoning, §11. The paradoxes, Kleene discusses Intuitionism and Formalism in depth. Throughout the rest of the book he treats, and compares, both Formalist (classical) and Intuitionist logics with an emphasis on the former. Extraordinary writing by an extraordinary mathematician.
 Mancosu, P. (ed., 1998), From Hilbert to Brouwer.  The Debate on the Foundations of Mathematics in the 1920s, Oxford University Press, Oxford, UK.
 Putnam, Hilary (1967), "Mathematics Without Foundations", Journal of Philosophy 64/1, 5–22.  Reprinted, pp. 168–184 in W.D. Hart (ed., 1996).
 —, "What is Mathematical Truth?", in Tymoczko (ed., 1986).
 
 Troelstra, A. S. (no date but later than 1990),  "A History of Constructivism in the 20th Century",  A detailed survey for specialists:  §1 Introduction, §2 Finitism & §2.2 Actualism, §3 Predicativism and Semi-Intuitionism, §4 Brouwerian Intuitionism, §5 Intuitionistic Logic and Arithmetic, §6 Intuitionistic Analysis and Stronger Theories, §7 Constructive Recursive Mathematics, §8 Bishop's Constructivism, §9 Concluding Remarks. Approximately 80 references.
 Tymoczko, T. (1986), "Challenging Foundations", in Tymoczko (ed., 1986).
 —,(ed., 1986), New Directions in the Philosophy of Mathematics, 1986.  Revised edition, 1998.
 van Dalen D. (2008), "Brouwer, Luitzen Egbertus Jan (1881–1966)", in Biografisch Woordenboek van Nederland. URL:http://www.inghist.nl/Onderzoek/Projecten/BWN/lemmata/bwn2/brouwerle [2008-03-13]
 Weyl, H. (1921), "Über die neue Grundlagenkrise der Mathematik", Mathematische Zeitschrift 10, 39–79.  Translated, "On the New Foundational Crisis of Mathematics", in (Mancosu 1998).
 Wilder, Raymond L. (1952), Introduction to the Foundations of Mathematics, John Wiley and Sons, New York, NY.

External links

Logic and Mathematics
Foundations of Mathematics: past, present, and future, May 31, 2000, 8 pages.
A Century of Controversy over the Foundations of Mathematics by Gregory Chaitin. 

 
Mathematical logic
History of mathematics
Philosophy of mathematics